Sá may refer to:
Sá, surname
de Sá, surname
D'Sá, surname

Places
 Sá (pt) - freguesia in the concelho of Arcos de Valdevez, Portugal
 Sá (pt) - freguesia in the concelho of Monção, Portugal
 Sá (pt) - freguesia in the concelho of Ponte de Lima, Portugal
 Sá - place in Tendais, Cinfães Municipality
 Sá (pt) - place in the concelho of Valpaços, Portugal
Sá da Bandeira (disambiguation), old name of Lubango, Angola